

Events and publications

Year overall 
 National Comics Publications v. Fawcett Publications is settled out of court; Fawcett agrees to quit using the Captain Marvel character(s) and pay DC Comics the sum of $400,000. Subsequently, Fawcett leaves the comics publishing business.
 Tut le Blanc's comic strip An Altar Boy Named Speck is first syndicated.
 The first episode of Yaakov Ashman and Elisheva Nadal's Gidi Gezer is published.

January
 January 9: Héctor Germán Oesterheld and Hugo Pratt's Sergeant Kirk makes its debut in the comics magazine Misterix.
January 20: In the story Avventura nell’Utah by Gian Luigi Bonelli and Galep, Tex Willer becomes supreme chief of the Navajo under the name “Night Eagle”.

February
 February 7: The first issue of the British comics magazine The Topper is published, which will run until 15 September 1990. In its first issue David Law's Beryl the Peril makes its debut. 
 February 23: The Nero story De Ring van Petatje by Marc Sleen is first published in the newspapers. Halfway the story Petatje makes her debut.
 February 24: Byron Aptosoglou publishes Mikrós Íros (The Little Hero), which will run until 18 June 1968. 
 February 25: The Flemish children's magazine Pum-Pum becomes a supplement of the newspaper Het Laatste Nieuws. It will run until 11 January 1967.
 In Walt Disney’s comics and stories Carl Barks' Donald Duck story Flip decision April, May and June make their debut.

March
 March 9: Elliott Caplin and Stan Drake's The Heart of Juliet Jones makes its debut. It will run until 1 January 2000. 
 Jumbo Comics (1938 series), with issue #167, canceled by Fiction House.
 In the Donald Duck story One Shots / Back to the Klondike by Carl Barks Goldie O'Gilt makes her debut.

April 
 April 1: The fourth issue of Mad Magazine features Harvey Kurtzman and Wally Wood's classic Superman parody Superduperman. This is the first specific comic book parody in Mad and strikes a nerve among readers. The previously low-selling Mad now finally becomes a best-seller.
 April 18: Barrie Appleby's Roger the Dodger makes its debut in The Beano.
 April 30: The first issue of Chez Nous Junior, a junior supplement to the Belgian magazine Chez Nous and a French-language version of the Dutch-language magazine Ons Volkske is published. In the first issue Tibet's Chick Bill makes its debut, albeit in a talking animal comic strip version. The cast will be humanized two years later. 
 Master Comics, with issue #133, cancelled by Fawcett.

May 
 May 30: In Charles M. Schulz' Peanuts Lucy van Pelt is first seen trying to get Schroeder's romantic attention. This will become a running gag in the series.
 Rolf Kauka's Fix and Foxi makes its debut.

June 
 Whiz Comics, with issue #155, canceled by Fawcett.
 Captain Marvel Jr., with issue #118, canceled by Fawcett.

July
 Lorna the Jungle Girl, issue #1, created by Don Rico and Werner Roth.

August
 August 8: In David Law's Dennis the Menace and Gnasher Walter Brown makes his debut. 
 August 29: Mars Ravelo's Bondying makes its debut.

September
 September 12: The final issue of the British comics magazine Illustrated Chips is published and merges with Film Fun.
 September 19: Paddy Brennan's General Jumbo makes its debut in The Beano.
 September 22: The passing of H. T. Webster also means the end of his long-running comic strip Timid Soul, better known under the name of its protagonist, Casper Milquetoast.
 The British comics magazine Comic Cuts is disestablished and merges with Knockout.
 The first issue of Little Dot is published, in which Richie Rich makes his debut.
 Joe Kubert and Norman Maurer's Tor makes its debut.

October
 October 1: The first issues of the Dutch children's and comics magazines Okki and Taptoe are published. The magazines will run until 2016.
 October 10: Leo Baxendale's Little Plum makes its debut in The Beano.

November 
 Captain Marvel Adventures (1941 series), with issue #150, canceled by Fawcett Comics.
 Hopalong Cassidy, with issue #85, canceled by Fawcett Comics.
 Two-Gun Kid (1948 series), with issue #11, revived by Marvel.
 Weird Fantasy, with issue #22, merges with Weird Science to become Weird Science-Fantasy (EC Comics)

December
 December 4: The Spirou and Fantasio story La Turbotraction is first prepublished in Spirou. Halfway the story Seccotine the journalist makes her debut. 
 December 19: Leo Baxendale's Minnie the Minx makes its debut in The Beano.
 December 23: Willy Vandersteen's gag comic  't Prinske debuts in Tintin.
 The long-running comics series Waddles is discontinued. Ray Carlson and Carol Hager had continued it since 1945.

Births

April
 April 3: Pieter Aspe, Belgian novelist and comics writer (wrote comics in collaboration with cartoonists like Kim Duchateau, Marec, Merho and Patrick van Oppen ), (d. 2021).

Deaths

January
 January 5: Ramiz Gökçe, Turkish comics artist (Tombul Teyze and Sıska Dayı), dies at age 52.
 January 12: Wilfred R. Cyr, American comics artist (Cabin Boy Exploits of Eve), passes away at age 73.
 January 23: 
 Raymond De La Nezière, French illustrator and comics artist, dies at age 85.
 Albert Hahn Jr., Dutch illustrator, caricaturist and comics artist (made text comics for De Notenkraker), dies at age 68.

February
 February 14: Mary Bergman, wife of cartoonist Billy DeBeck and establisher of the annual Billy De Beck Awards, dies  in a plane crash.

April
 April 18: Frank Reynolds, British cartoonist and illustrator (The Bristlewoods), dies at age 67.

May
 May 5: Dick Dorgan, American comics artist (Kid Dugan, Colonel Gilfeather, continued You Know Me, Al), dies at age 60.
 May 11: Hermann Schütz, German painter, illustrator and comic artist (Der Contibuben), dies at age 77. 
 May 25: Charles Quinlan, aka Carl Quinn, American comics artist (worked for Funnies Inc., L.B. Cole Studio and Sangor Studio), dies at age 52.

June
 June 20: Émile-Joseph Pinchon, French comics artist (Bécassine), dies at age 72.

July
 July 24: Eelco Harmsen van der Beek, Dutch illustrator and comics artist (Flipje van Tiel), dies at age 56.
 July 31: Kornel Makuszyński, Polish novelist and comics writer (Koziołek Matołek), dies at age 69.

October
 October 2: Les Forgrave, American comics artist (Big Sister) and writer (Aladdin Junior, Secrets of Magic), passes away at age 71.
 October 21: George Kerr, American comics artist and illustrator (Santa Claus Funnies), dies at age 84.

November
 November 29: Karl Arnold, German painter, caricaturist and comics artist (made various comics for Simplicissimus), dies at age 70.
 November 29: Milt Gross, American comics artist (He Done Her Wrong, Count Screwloose), passes away at age 58.

December
 December 17: Stephen Slesinger, American radio, film and TV producer and comics writer (Red Ryder, King of the Royal Mounted), dies at age 51.
 December 25: William Haselden, British caricaturist, cartoonist and comics artist (The Sad Experiences of Big and Little Willie), dies at age 81.

Specific date unknown
 Curt Junghändel, German illustrator, dies at age 78 or 79. 
 Leon Kern, French caricaturist and comics artist (La Famille Pouic), dies at age 69 or 70.

First issues by title

Atlas Comics/Marvel Comics 
Bible Tales for Young Folk
Buck Duck
Crazy
Homer Hooper
Little Lizzie
Lorna the Jungle Queen
 Menace (Mar.)
Monkey and the Bear, The
Patsy and her Pals
Secret Story Romances
Speed Carter, Spaceman
Wendy Parker Comics

Other publishers 
 Atomic Mouse (Mar.) — Charlton Comics
 Classics Illustrated Junior (Oct.) — Gilberton
 Little Dot (Sept.) — Harvey Comics
Princess Knight, by Osamu Tezuka, first serialized in Kodansha's Shōjo Club (Jan.)
 The Topper #1 (Feb. 7) - D.C. Thomson and Co.
 Uncle Scrooge (Dec.) — Dell Comics

Renamed titles

Atlas Comics/Marvel Comics 
Battle Brady #10 renamed from Men in Action
Bible Tales for Young People #3 renamed from Bible Tales for Young Folk
Combat Casey #6 renamed from War Combat
Miss America #50 renamed from Miss America Magazine
Young Men #21 renamed from Young Men on the Battlefield
Young Men in Action #24 renamed from Young Men

Other publishers 
United States Marines #7-11 renamed from Fighting Leathernecks - Toby Press

Initial appearances by character name

DC Thomson & Co. 
 Beryl the Peril, in The Topper #1 (Feb. 7)
 General Jumbo, in The Beano #583 (19 Sept.)
 Little Plum, in The Beano #586 (10 Oct.)
 Minnie the Minx, in The Beano #596 (19 Dec.)
 Roger the Dodger, in The Beano #561 (18 Apr.)

Other publishers 
 Atomic Mouse, in Atomic Mouse #1 (Charlton Comics, Mar.)
 Captain 3-D, in Captain 3-D #1 (Harvey Comics, Dec.)
 Captain Harlock, in Adventures of a Honeybee
 Little Lotta, in Little Dot #1 (Harvey Comics, Sept.)
 Richie Rich, in Little Dot #1 (Harvey Comics, Sept.)
 Ringo Kid, in The Ringo Kid Western #1 (Atlas Comics, Aug.)
 Superduperman, in Mad #4 (EC, Apr./May)
 Zombie, in Menace #5 (Atlas Comics, July)

References

 
1950s comics